Ponciano Leiva Madrid (1821–1896) was President of Honduras 13 January 1874 – 8 June 1876 and 30 November 1891 – 7 August 1893. Leiva was a conservative.

Leiva was a soldier and initially came to power through the support of the military. He rose to the rank of general.

Leiva initially came to power by overthrowing his predecessor in a coup. In 1876 he left office due to pressure from Justo Rufino Barrios, the president of Guatemala.

He later served as minister of war to Luis Bográn, and then was elected to the presidency in 1891.  In this election held on 10 November 1891 Leiva received the majority of the vote.  His main opponent in the election was Policarpo Bonilla.  In 1893 Leiva resigned from office due to the threat of revolution and was replaced by Domingo Vasquez.

References 

1821 births
1896 deaths
People from Santa Bárbara Department, Honduras
Honduran people of Spanish descent
Presidents of Honduras